Histioea cepheus is a moth of the subfamily Arctiinae. It was described by Pieter Cramer in 1779. It is found in Trinidad, Suriname and Venezuela.

References

 

Arctiinae
Moths described in 1779